Giovanni Saverio Furio Pittella (born 19 November 1958) is an Italian politician who served as Leader of the Progressive Alliance of Socialists and Democrats Group from 2014 to 2018 and Member of the European Parliament (MEP) from Italy from 1999 to 2018. He previously served as First Vice President of the European Parliament from 2009 to 2014.

Political career

Local and national political career 
Following the political career of his father Domenico Pittella, who was a member of the Senate (1972–1983), he was a member of the Italian Socialist Party, Labour Federation and Democrats of the Left.

At the age of 21, he was elected to the municipal council of his hometown Lauria and a year later became a member of the regional council of Basilicata with responsibility for training, culture and productive activities.

After graduating in medicine and surgery and later specialising in legal and forensic medicine at the University of Naples Federico II Pitella remained very much involved in local and national politics. In the 1996 elections, he was elected to the Italian Parliament.

In 2013, Pittella was a member of the national leadership council of the PD, then led by Pier Luigi Bersani. He took part in the 2013 Democratic Party leadership election. He came fourth out of four with 5.7% in the vote by party members, thus being excluded to the subsequent primary election.

Member of the European Parliament, 1999–present 
In the 1999 European elections, Pittella was elected to the European Parliament and became a member of the Progressive Alliance of Socialists and Democrats. He was re-elected in 2004, 2009 and 2014. In 2014, he added over 100,000 votes to his 2009 result, placing him ahead of party-colleague Pina Picierno, the candidate hand-picked by Prime Minister Matteo Renzi to lead the PD list in the European Parliament's southern Italian constituency representing Sicily and the other Italian islands.

In the European Parliament, Pittella first served on the Committee on Budgets between 1999 and 2009. In this capacity, he was the Parliament's rapporteur on the 2006 budget, the last under a seven-year expenditure framework. He later was a member of the Committee on the Internal Market and Consumer Protection (2009-2012) and the Committee on Culture and Education (2012-2014). Within his parliamentary group, he led the Italian delegation within the Progressive Alliance of Socialists and Democrats and also served as the group's First Vice-Chairman between 1999 and 2014, under the leadership of successive chairmen Enrique Barón Crespo (1999-2004), Martin Schulz (2004-2012) and Hannes Swoboda (2012-2014).

Pittella served as one of the 14 Vice-Presidents of the European Parliament from 14 July 2009 to 1 July 2014. Following the 2014 elections, on 6 June 2014, he was elected with 96 percent of the votes as the President of the Progressive Alliance of Socialists and Democrats, the second largest political group at the European Parliament and the only one with members from all 28 EU member states.

In addition to his committee assignments and party functions, Pittella served on the Parliament's delegation. He was previously a member of the delegation for relations with Albania, Bosnia and Herzegovina, Serbia, Montenegro and Kosovo (2009-2014); with Australia and New Zealand (2002-2004); and with Armenia, Azerbaijan and Georgia (1999-2002).

In 2016, Pittella attended the Democratic National Convention in Philadelphia to watch the nomination of Hillary Clinton.

Italian elections, 2018
In the 2018 general election in Italy, Pittella was elected to the Italian Senate, having been invited to stand by Democratic Party chairman Matteo Renzi. He subsequently resigned as leader of the S&D Group.

Other activities
 Fondation européenne d'études progressistes (FEPS), Ex-Officio Member of the Bureau

Recognition
 Honorary citizen of the City of Buenos Aires

Personal life
Besides his political work, Gianni is the author of several books on the future and challenges of the European project such as a Brief History of the Future of the United States of Europe (2013). He is also a visiting professor at the University of East Anglia's London Academy of Diplomacy.

Gianni Pittella is married and has two children.

In September 2013 Pittella's younger brother, Marcello, whose political trajectory is very similar to that of Gianni, won the centre-left primary for the Presidency of Basilicata. In November he was elected President by a landslide.

Career
Here is a summary of Pittella's biography:
 Graduate in Medicine, specialization in Forensic pathology
 Member of the Italian Socialist Party, regional secretary of Young Socialists in Basilicata
 1979: Municipal councillor in Lauria (Italian Socialist Party)
 1980: Member of the Regional Council of Basilicata (Italian Socialist Party)
 1996: Member of the Chamber of Deputies (Labour Federation)
 1999: Member of the European Parliament (Democrats of the Left, Democratic Party)
 2009: Vice President of the European Parliament
 2014: President of the Progressive Alliance of Socialists and Democrats

Controversies 

In 2012, Pittella introduced, in Brussels, Simona Mangiante to Joseph Mifsud, a Maltese academic, reportedly with high level ties with the Russian government.  At the time, Mangiante worked for the European Parliament as an attorney specializing in child abduction cases. Latter she worked as an administrator to the European Parliament Committee on Civil Liberties, Justice and Home Affairs during the Seventh European Parliament. In 2018, Mangiante told The Guardian, "I always saw Mifsud with Pittella." and that Pittella suggested she go to work for Mifsud in London. In London, she met George Papadopoulos during the 2016 presidential campaign, whom she married in 2018. Papadopoulos was convicted as part of Robert Mueller's Special Counsel investigation into Russian interference in the 2016 US presidential election.

References

External links

 
 

|-

1958 births
Living people
People from Lauria
Italian Socialist Party politicians
Labour Federation (Italy) politicians
Democrats of the Left politicians
Deputies of Legislature XIII of Italy
Senators of Legislature XVIII of Italy
Politicians of Basilicata
Democrats of the Left MEPs
Democratic Party (Italy) MEPs
Presidents of the European Parliament
MEPs for Italy 1999–2004
MEPs for Italy 2004–2009
MEPs for Italy 2009–2014
MEPs for Italy 2014–2019